Félix Thiollier (28 June 1842, Saint Étienne – 12 May 1914, Saint Étienne) was a French industrialist, writer, art collector and photographer. 

His father, Claude Auguste, was a ribbon maker. In 1857, he started a ribbon company in Saint Étienne. At age 37 he retired and pursued his interests in art, archeology and photography. His photography was influenced by the work of Camille Corot and he befriended François-Auguste Ravier, Paul Borel, Jean-Paul Laurens and François Guiguet.

In 1870, he married Gabrielle Testenoire-Lafayette. They had five children.

Gallery

Notes and references

External links
 

1842 births
1914 deaths
French photographers